Air Sylhet plc plc was founded by British Bangladeshi businessmen from the Sylhet region of Bangladesh and headquartered in London. Air Sylhet AG was its wholly owned, short-lived Austrian airline subsidiary based at Vienna International Airport.

History

Air Sylhet plc was established in 2007 and a registered UK public limited company which had received over £1m in investment, primarily from the UK Bangladeshi Sylheti community. Air Sylhet AG was a wholly owned subsidiary of Air Sylhet plc and obtained its Austrian AOC and operating licence on 29 May 2008. Formal notice of its AOC and OL has been published in the Official Journal of the European Union (2008/C 178/15) 

Air Sylhet started scheduled flights to Amritsar from Birmingham with a technical stopover at Vienna from 4 April 2009. However, the sole scheduled route was suspended after just one month when the fledgling business collapsed and subsequently ceased operations.

Destinations
Air Sylhet served the following destinations: 
Amritsar - Amritsar Airport
Birmingham - Birmingham Airport
Vienna - Vienna International Airport

Fleet
The Air Sylhet fleet consisted of the following aircraft:

 1 Boeing 757-200 (leased from Gadair European Airlines)

See also
 List of defunct airlines of the United Kingdom

References

External links
Official website (archived)

Defunct airlines of Austria
Airlines established in 2007
Airlines disestablished in 2009
2009 disestablishments in Austria
Austrian companies established in 2007